Power of Siberia (Sila Sibiri, formerly named the Yakutia–Khabarovsk–Vladivostok pipeline, also known as China–Russia East-Route Natural Gas pipeline;) is a Gazprom-operated pipeline in Eastern Siberia that transports natural gas from Yakutia to Primorsky Krai and China. It is a part of the eastern gas route from Siberia to China. The proposed western gas route to China is known as Power of Siberia 2 (Altai gas pipeline).

History

In 2007, the Ministry of Industry and Energy of Russia approved the Eastern Gas Program, which included construction  of the Yakutia–Khabarovsk–Vladivostok pipeline.

On 29 October 2012, Russian president Vladimir Putin instructed Alexey Miller, CEO of Gazprom to start the construction of the pipeline. The Yakutia–Khabarovsk–Vladivostok pipeline project was officially renamed Power of Siberia at the end of 2012.

On 21 May 2014, Russia and China signed a 30-year gas deal worth $400 billion which was needed to make the project feasible. Construction was launched on 1 September 2014 in Yakutsk by Putin and Chinese deputy prime minister Zhang Gaoli. Construction of the connecting pipeline in China started on 29 June 2015.

On 4 September 2016, Miller and China National Petroleum Corporation's Chairman Wang Yilin signed an agreement to build a crossing under the Amur River for the pipeline. Two tunnels under the river were completed by China Petroleum Pipeline in March 2019.

In 2017, construction of the Atamanskaya (Zeyskaya) compressor station began. The Atamanskaya and Chayandinskaya compressor stations were completed in 2019. Construction of all compressor stations is scheduled to be completed by 2022.

The pipeline was filled with gas in October 2019. Deliveries to China started on 2 December 2019. In 2020, China has imported 4.1 billion cubic meters of natural gas from Russia through the pipeline. It is expected that amount will increase to 38 billion cubic meters by 2023.

Technical description
Together with the development of the Chayanda field and the Amur Gas Processing Plant, the whole Power of Siberia project was expected to cost US$55–70 billion.  , the pipeline was estimated to cost 1.1 trillion roubles, the development of the Chayanda field was estimated to cost 450 billion roubles, and the Amur Gas Processing Plant was estimated to cost 950 billion roubles.

The total length of the pipeline, when fully completed, will be .

The pipeline's working pressure is ensured by nine compressor stations with a total capacity of 1,200 MW. The Chayandinskaya compressor station has capacity of 577 MW and the Atamanskaya compressor station has capacity of 128 MW. The remaining seven compressor stations—Saldykelskaya, Olyokminskaya, Amginskaya, Nimnyrkaya, Nagornaya, Skovorodinskaya, and Sivakiskaya—have a total capacity of 481 MW.

It has a nanocomposite coating to increase the lifetime of the pipeline. To withstand earthquakes, the pipeline uses materials that will deform under seismic activity. Internal coatings ensure energy efficiency by reducing the friction of the pipeline's inner surfaces. The mass of all the pipes used to construct the pipeline is more than 2.25 million tonnes (2.5 million tons).

According to the study published by the Cambridge University Press, the pipeline seems to avoid technical and legal standards applied to similar pipelines from Russia to Europe because of lower requirements in both Russia and China.

Route
The pipeline is fed from the Chayanda field in Yakutia, which was launched in 2019. The Kovykta field in Irkutsk Oblast will start to supply to the pipeline in 2023. The  first phase of the pipeline starts at the Chayanda field in Yakutia. It runs, partly within the same corridor as the Eastern Siberia–Pacific Ocean oil pipeline, through Lensk, Olyokminsk, Aldan, Neryungri, Skovorodino, and  Svobodny, where the pipeline is connected to the Amur Gas Processing Plant. From there, the pipeline branches south to Blagoveshchensk on the Russia–China border. By the two  tunnels under the Amur River, it is connected to the  Heihe–Shanghai pipeline in China. Together they form the eastern route for gas supplies from Siberia to China.

The  second phase of the pipeline connects the Kovykta field to the Chayanda field. According to the original plan, the further  extension of the Power of Siberia pipeline will continue from Svobodny through Birobidzhan to Khabarovsk where the pipeline will be linked with the Sakhalin–Khabarovsk–Vladivostok pipeline. Gazprom has not published if and when this extension will be built.

Contractors
Gazprom Transgaz Tomsk was the main construction contractor, while VNIPIgazdobycha, both subsidiaries of Gazprom, was the general design contractor.

Different sections of the pipeline were built by Stroytransgaz owned by Gennady Timchenko, Neftegazstroy, and Stroygazmontazh owned by Arkady Rotenberg.

Pipes were manufactured by the Vyksa Steel Works of OMK, the Chelyabinsk Pipe Rolling Plant, the Izhora Pipe Mill of Severstal, the Volzhsky Pipe Plant of TMK, Zagorsk Pipe Plant, and Pipe Innovative Technologies. Anti-corrosion nanocomposite coating of pipes was done by Metaclay, a joint venture of Rusnano and Gazprom. Compressor turbine units were supplied by UEC-Perm Engines.

Impact 
The pipeline has strong implications for energy security in both China and Russia in the short term. 

For China, the pipeline diversifies natural gas supplies for China. It is designed to reduce China's dependence on coal, which is more carbon intensive and causes more pollution than natural gas. 

For Russia, the pipeline allows another economic partnership in the face of resistance to pipelines being built in Western Europe.

See also

 Central Asia–China gas pipeline
 Energy policy of China
 Energy policy of Russia
 West–East Gas Pipeline

References

External links

Energy in Siberia
Gazprom pipelines
Natural gas pipelines in Russia